= LeRoy G. Schultz =

- Occupation: professor

Academic work
- Discipline: Social Work
- Institutions: West Virginia University

LeRoy G. Schultz (1928–2012) was a West Virginia University professor of social work.

== Publications ==
- The Sexual Victimology of Youth (1980)
- Rape Victimology (1974)
- Human Sexuality and Social Work (1972)
- Barns, Stables, and Outbuildings (1986)
